Mechanical Animals was a worldwide tour by the band Marilyn Manson in support of their third LP record Mechanical Animals, released on September 15, 1998. The tour extended from late 1998 to early 1999 and was recorded in 1998 for the VHS-format God is in the TV which was released on November 2, 1999.

The Mechanical Animals European Festival Tour was supposed to be the first leg of the tour. This particular leg of the tour consisted of six dates to be played at various European festivals planned as the debut of follow-up material to Antichrist Superstar two months before the release of Mechanical Animals. This leg of the tour spanned from June 25, 1998, until July 12, 1999.

Reportedly, drummer Ginger Fish became ill with mononucleosis. This led the band to cancel the entire summer European leg and postpone the beginning of the tour to October 25, 1998.

Beginning on October 25, 1998, and lasting until January 31, 1999, the "Mechanical Animals Tour" included two legs spanning a Fall to Winter World Tour in Europe, Japan, and North America and a 6 show headlining stint at the Big Day Out Music Festival in Australia.

Background

After declining a headlining slot at the failing Lollapalooza summer music festival (along with numerous other bands) in early 1998 due to delays in Mechanical Animals' release, the band launched the first of their own headlining tours in support of the album. The tour was originally intended to begin on June 25, 1998, with a series of 6 festival dates in Europe lasting until July 12, 1998. However, drummer Ginger Fish became ill with mononucleosis, leading to the cancellation of the entire summer European leg and the postponement of the beginning of the tour to October 25, 1998, in Lawrence, Kansas.

Performance and show themes
With this being the first leg of the tour, the stage show was minimal compared to later legs of the tour

Incidents
As with the band's preceding 1997 world tour, Dead to the World, the Mechanical Animals Tour met with heavy resistance from civic and religious leaders. The first of these protests occurred on October 19, 1998. A month before a planned performance at the Landmark Theatre in Syracuse, New York, local activists began calling for a cancellation of the engagement. According to Associated Press, then-Syracuse Mayor Roy Bernardi attempted to block the venue's permit, citing a "moral obligation to the people of Syracuse", without specifying any reason for his objections. Onondaga County officials also attempted to extort the Landmark into halting the event by threatening to withhold $30,000 in county funds earmarked for the venue, prompting the venue's bookers to consider dropping the show altogether. Despite this, representatives for the Landmark started selling tickets on the day it was planned and the performance took place on the arranged date and venue.

Set list

North America

 The Reflecting God
 Great Big White World
 Cake and Sodomy
 Posthuman
 Mechanical Animals
 I Want to Disappear
 Sweet Dreams (Are Made of This)
 The Speed of Pain
 Rock Is Dead
 The Dope Show
 Lunchbox
 User Friendly
 I Don't Like the Drugs (But the Drugs Like Me)
 Rock N Roll Nigger
 The Beautiful People
 Irresponsible Hate Anthem

Europe/Asia

 Inauguration of the Mechanical Christ
 The Reflecting God
 Great Big White World
 Cake and Sodomy
 Sweet Dreams (Are Made of This)
 Astonishing Panorama of the Endtimes
 Rock Is Dead
 The Dope Show
 Lunchbox
 I Don't Like the Drugs (But the Drugs Like Me)
 Rock N Roll Nigger
 The Beautiful People

Broadcasts and recordings

Various shows were recorded on the tour but there was no specific information about which dates. A 40-minute short film was released on VHS entitled God Is in the T.V. following the tour, however it only contained short live clips from various shows. Widely heralded as the band's best tour, their 2012 comeback sparked interest in the release of an uninterrupted live DVD of this tour. It is not known if the full recordings exist of the performances shown in God Is in the T.V.. The only full live recordings available are bootleg from their January 23, 1999 concert in Sydney, Australia during their headlining stint at the Big Day Out Music Festival. The video is of mediocre quality. A rare partial recording of the band's concert on November 16, 1998, in Detroit, Michigan, and unedited aftershow promotional interview also exist.

Tour dates

Cancelled or rescheduled shows

Lineup
Marilyn Manson
Marilyn Manson: Vocals
John 5: Guitar
Twiggy Ramirez: Bass
Madonna Wayne Gacy: Keyboards
Ginger Fish: Drums

Reception

Critical reception
Music critic Tim Finn of The Kansas City Star commented that, overall, the show was "far less a spectacle than the Antichrist Superstar tour."

References

Marilyn Manson (band) concert tours
1998 concert tours